Marek Czekalski (6 June 1953 – 2 April 2021) was a Polish politician and engineer. He served as Mayor of Łódź from 1994 to 1998.

Biography
In 1978, he joined the Committee for Social Self-Defense KOR. In 1980, he joined the Solidarity trade union and was elected president of its textile section. After Martial law in Poland was imposed the following year, he left the union and joined its underground structures. He would organize help for those repressed for political reasons.

In 1989, Czekalski became active in the Solidarity Citizens' Committee. The following year, he was elected to serve on the Municipal Council of Łódź and worked on the presidential campaign of Tadeusz Mazowiecki. He was a part of the Citizens' Movement for Democratic Action and became chairman of the Democratic Union in Łódź Voivodeship, serving for two terms.

He restructured the municipal council two years into his term with support from the Democratic Left Alliance. He served as Mayor until his term expired in November 1998. He then returned to the municipal council.

Shortly before the 2001 Polish parliamentary election, in which he was a Sejm candidate for the Freedom Union, Czekalski was arrested for accepting a bribe from investors for plans to allow construction of a new shopping center. Criminal proceedings continued for nearly ten years before he was finally acquitted of all charges in February 2011.

Marek Czekalski died on 2 April 2021, at the age of 67.

Distinctions
Knight's Cross of the Order of Polonia Restituta (1999)

References

1953 births
2021 deaths
Polish engineers
Mayors of Łódź
Freedom Union (Poland) politicians
Democratic Union (Poland) politicians
Polish United Workers' Party members
Łódź University of Technology alumni
Recipients of the Order of Polonia Restituta
People from Łódź